The Sleeze Brothers was a  comic book limited series published by Marvel's Epic Comics imprint, between August 1989 and January 1990 (UK release dates), lasting for 6 issues. A collection of the six issues were later released in 1990, along with a final extended issue in 1991. It was written by John Carnell, with art by Andy Lanning. The characters were spun off from a Doctor Who comic strip by Carnell entitled "Follow That TARDIS!", published in Doctor Who Magazine #147 (April 1989), though they are not generally considered part of the Doctor Who extended universe.

Overview 
The comic depicts a futuristic Earth rife with extraterrestrials, pollution, crime and corruption. The focus of the stories are El' Ape and Deadbeat Sleeze, two private eye brothers, who ply their trade in the seedy underbelly of The Big Apple, a futuristic city taking its name from the nickname of New York City.

In the comics Deadbeat and El' Ape Sleeze are described as dysfunctional orphans who grew up in an orphanage for unwanted "boil in the bag" test tube babies. As adults they use amoral and often underhanded methods to get the results demanded by their insalubrious and eclectic clients.

Within the Marvel Comics multiverse, the Sleeze Brothers reality is designated as Earth-89547.

Influences 
The title characters in the Sleeze Brothers comics were loosely inspired by Jake and Elwood Blues from the cult movie The Blues Brothers, but were actually based on Andy Lanning's two cousins, Phil and Pete Carmichael. These two characters appeared on the front cover of the collected edition.

Undercurrents 
The comics themselves are littered with contemporary parodies of both real and fictional characters, and occasional real life current affairs from 1989 and 1990. Additionally, the Sleeze Brothers storylines feature a variety of comical adult situations, and colourful (though not profane) language.

Supporting characters 
 Sergent Pigheadski: a two-headed humanoid swine police captain;
 President Sinatra: a part-cyborg amalgam of Frank Sinatra and Ronald Reagan;
 The Cosmos Father: an intergalactic mafia don;
 Wong: an Asian restaurateur thinly veiled as a humanoid feline.
 Papa Beatbox: the aging African American caretaker of the orphanage and the Sleeze Brothers' father figure.

Issues 
 Issue #1: "Nice And Sleezy" (aka "Anytime, Anyplanet, Anything!") 
 Issue #2: "Reel To Real"
 Issue #3: "The Big Leap"
 Issue #4: "Murder In Space"
 Issue #5: "Down In The Sewer"
 Issue #6: "The Maltese Egg"
 Six issue collection: "The Sleeze Brothers File"
 Additional one-shot issue: "The Sleeze Brothers: Some Like It Fresh"

Additional appearances 
 Doctor Who Magazine #147 : "Follow that TARDIS! Part One"; reprinted in Doctor Who Classics Series V #1 and Doctor Who Classics vol. 9
 The Totally Stonking, Surprisingly Educational And Utterly Mindboggling Comic Relief Comic
 Epic Book 2: "Saturday Nite Special!"
 Elephantmen #16 (back-up story)

References

External links
 The Sleeze Brothers website
 El 'Ape and Deadbeat Sleeze: The Sleeze Brothers

1989 comics debuts
Comics by Andy Lanning
Marvel UK titles
Epic Comics titles
Science fiction comics